Baek Chul-min, known by the stage name Go On, is South Korean actor and model. He is known for his lead role in Andante. He is also for his roles in dramas such as Solomon's Perjury, Kill Me, Heal Me and Witch at Court.

Biography and career
Baek Chul Min is a South Korean actor before debuted as an actor, he was a professional model. Born on July 5, 1992, he made his acting debut in the 2014 television drama Secret Door. He gained attention with a supporting role in the popular 2015 drama Kill Me, Heal Me as Alex that gained him wider recognition. He then appeared in dramas such as Run Toward Tomorrow, Matching! Boys Archery and Solomon's Perjury. He also did a lead role in Andante.

Filmography

Television

Film

References

External links 
 
 

1992 births
Living people
21st-century South Korean male actors
South Korean male models
South Korean male television actors
South Korean male film actors